Megachile meadewaldoi is a species of bee in the family Megachilidae. It was described by Brauns in 1912.

References

Meadewaldoi
Insects described in 1912